Anchorage Yacht Basin is a historic marina at the junction of the Indian River and Banana River at Indian Harbor Beach, Melbourne, Florida.

Anchorage Yacht Basin is a second generation family owned full service marina with a fuel dock, ship store, and service department. Anchorage Yacht Basin is also a top-rated boat dealership for EdgeWater, Chris Craft, Crevalle, and Clearwater boats with 5-star google and social media reviews.  Tho they have been slipping tremendously and gaining significant complaints online since mid-2021 across most review sites and forums for an enigmatic reason, but mostly relative to sales. IE: hulltruth.org, facebook, and several leading publications within the marine industry. The marina can be found on nautical charts at  directly across from the original location of the Merritt Island Dragon, (Dragon Point). 

The marina is beneficial for those who are traveling on the Intracoastal Waterway.

External links
Anchorage Yacht Basin

Marinas in the United States
Buildings and structures in Melbourne, Florida